"Out of Time" is a song by Canadian singer the Weeknd. It was released to American urban adult contemporary radio through XO and Republic Records on January 25, 2022, as the third single from his fifth studio album Dawn FM. The song was written and produced by the Weeknd and Oneohtrix Point Never; with Tomoko Aran and Tetsurō Oda receiving songwriting credits for the sampling of Aran's 1983 song "Midnight Pretenders". Max Martin and Oscar Holter received additional production credits. The track also features additional vocals by Jim Carrey, who provides narration throughout the album. The song also won an MTV Video Music Award for Best R&B Video in 2022.

Background and promotion
"Out of Time" was released on January 7, 2022, alongside its parent album. It was sent to American urban adult contemporary radio on January 25 as the album's third single.

Lyrics and composition
"Out Of Time" has been described by critics as an R&B and city pop ballad with elements of boogie. The song is written in the key of C minor with a tempo of 93 beats per minute. Lyrically, the song details how the Weeknd's trauma from past relationships has negatively affected his ability to fix the romantic relationship he had with his former partner.

Music video 
The music video for "Out of Time" was released on April 5, 2022. Directed by Cliqua, it features actress and model HoYeon Jung. In the video, The Weeknd and Jung meet in an empty hotel and quickly bond over singing the song in a karaoke box. They steal the karaoke machine and frolic around the hotel drinking, dancing, and singing the song in shots that pay homage to scenes from Sofia Coppola's Lost in Translation (2003). Towards the end, however, an older version of Abel tries to reach out to his present self, before the video transitions to the older Abel's point of view in a surgery room, where Jim Carrey, narrating the final lines, puts a mask on him.

Critical reception
"Out of Time" received acclaim from critics for the song's production and the Weeknd's vocals. Heran Mamo of Billboard named the track as the second-best song from the album, highlighting "The swirling flute and shimmering production feels like he’s in a fairytale where he can turn back time with just the snap of his fingers". A New University review called the song “one of the album’s masterpieces”.

Track listing
Digital download
"Out of Time" – 3:34

Remix bundle
"Out of Time" (Kaytranada remix) – 4:35
"Out of Time" (Kaytranada remix; radio edit) – 2:35
"Out of Time" – 3:34
"Out of Time" (instrumental) – 3:34
"Out of Time" (video) – 3:53

Charts

Weekly charts

Year-end charts

Release history

References

External links
 
 
 
 

2022 songs
2022 singles
Songs written by the Weeknd
The Weeknd songs
Song recordings produced by the Weeknd
Song recordings produced by Max Martin
Republic Records singles
Songs written by Tetsurō Oda
Songs written by Oneohtrix Point Never